René Le Bossu or  (16 March 163114 March 1680) was a French literary critic.

Le Bossu was born in Paris, studied at Nanterre, and in 1649 became one of the regular canons of the Abbey of St Genevieve. His published his first book, in 1674. The book aimed to show that the principles of Aristotle and René Descartes were more similar than generally thought. This book was indifferently received.

His second book, was published in 1675 on epic poetry. It was highly praised by Nicolas Boileau-Despréaux. Its leading doctrine was that the subject should be chosen before the characters, and that the action should be arranged without reference to the personages who are to figure in the scene. This book was reprinted in several editions, and was translated into English.

Works
 
 
English translation:

References

External links

 

French literary critics
1631 births
1680 deaths
French male non-fiction writers